Trairi is a municipality in the state of Ceará in the Northeast region of Brazil.

Trairi has a population of approximately 56000 inhabitants (2020) and is famous for its shoreline stretching from Guajiru to Mundaú.
In 2013 the construction of a huge controversial windmill park began in the dunes from Barra Grande to the Mundaú River.

See also
List of municipalities in Ceará

References

Municipalities in Ceará
Populated coastal places in Ceará